Long Knives Drawn is the fourth studio album by American indie rock band Rainer Maria.

Track listing
All tracks composed by Caithlin DeMarrais, Kyle Fischer and William Kuehn.

"Mystery and Misery" – 4:43
"Long Knives" – 3:08
"Ears Ring" – 3:43
"The Double Life" – 3:29
"The Awful Truth of Loving" – 4:57
"The Imperatives" – 4:29
"Floors" – 4:13
"CT Catholic" – 3:51
"Situation, Relation" – 2:51

Personnel
Caithlin De Marrais  – bass, vocals
Kaia Fischer –  guitar, vocals 
William Kuehn – drums
Mark Haines – producer, engineer, mixing 
Mark Owens – design
Matt Owens – design
Rainer Maria – design
Danielle Saint Laurent – photography

Rainer Maria albums
2003 albums